Eriocapitella × hybrida is a hybrid of flowering plants in the buttercup family Ranunculaceae. The parents of the hybrid are E. japonica and E. vitifolia. Cultivars of the hybrid are commonly known as Japanese anemone hybrids.

Description

It forms large clumps of dark green, ternate, basal leaves on long petioles (leaf stalks). The pubescent leaflets are ovate, with deep lobes and serrate margins (edges). The inflorescence is a large, loose cyme with semi-double flowers. The center of the flower is surrounded by prominent golden stamens.

Taxonomy

Eriocapitella × hybrida was described by Maarten J. M. Christenhusz and James W. Byng in 2018. Like other members of genus Eriocapitella, E. × hybrida was formerly a member of genus Anemone. In particular, the historically important synonym Anemone × hybrida Paxton and the basionym Anemone japonica var. hybrida L.H.Bailey were described in 1848 and 1914, respectively.

Ecology

Eriocapitella × hybrida along with four other taxa (E. hupehensis, E. japonica, E. tomentosa, and E. vitifolia) are known as fall-blooming anemones. The bloom period depends on the particular cultivar and location, but at Longwood Gardens for example, E. × hybrida 'Königin Charlotte' bloomed from mid September to early November.

Cultivation

The artificial hybrid Eriocapitella × hybrida was developed at the gardens of the Royal Horticultural Society in 1848. As reported by Joseph Paxton at the time, gardeners crossed the so-called Japanese anemone E. japonica with E. vitifolia to produce a hardy fall-blooming hybrid with rose-colored flowers. The parent species were previously brought to England from their native Asia: E. vitifolia was brought from Nepal in 1829 while E. japonica was brought from China in 1844. European horticulturalists in Great Britain, Germany, and France subsequently introduced dozens of cultivars. Commonly called Japanese anemone hybrids, the cultivars of E. × hybrida have single, semi-double, or double flowers with white, pink, or purple sepals.

At the Chicago Botanic Garden, Rudy experimented with 26 cultivars of fall-blooming anemones over a 5-year period beginning in 1998. His experiments included 18 cultivars of E. × hybrida, of which more than half had a bloom length greater than 48 days.

, the following cultivars of E. × hybrida have gained the Award of Garden Merit (AGM) from the Royal Horticultural Society:

 E. × hybrida 'Elegans', also known as E. × hybrida 'Max Vogel'
 E. × hybrida 'Honorine Jobert'
 E. × hybrida 'Königin Charlotte' ('Queen Charlotte')

 E. × hybrida 'September Charm'

The cultivars E. × hybrida 'Andrea Atkinson', E. × hybrida 'Lady Gilmour', and E. × hybrida 'Robustissima' were removed from the AGM list in 2013.

Bibliography

References

External links
 
 
 
 
 
 
 
 
 
 
 

hybrida
Plants described in 2018
Taxa named by Maarten J. M. Christenhusz
Taxa named by James W. Byng